Podiceps miocenicus is an extinct species of large Late Miocene grebe from Moldova.

History
The species was found at Chișinău as part of fossil collecting survey in the aforementioned place, as well as Bujorul and Kalfa starting with 1974. The species was described by Eugene Kessler in 1984. The species name "miocenicus" refers to the Miocene age of the grebe.

Description
The holotype and only specimen (LPUI 61-MS) is a right humerus broken into two fragmentary pieces. The two pieces are a proximal epiphysis with diaphysis and a distal epiphysis. The overall form and dimensions is similar to the humeri of the great crested grebe (P. cristatus) but is slightly larger. In comparison to available humeri from other Neogene fossil grebes recovered from Eurasia, P. miocenicus is the largest.

Paleobiology
P. miocenicus comes from the Tortonian age of the Miocene epoch. During this point in Earth's history much of Central Europe covered by a large, shallow inland sea known as the Paratethys. P. miocenicus would have been a contemporary with various seabird and marine mammals whose fossil remains have been heavily documented.

References

miocenicus
Fossil taxa described in 1984
Tortonian species
Birds described in 1984